Fatima Robinson (born August 29, 1971) is an American dancer, music video director and choreographer.

Career

Robinson has choreographed dance routines (for live performances and music videos) for several musical and pop artists, notably for the late Michael Jackson ("Remember the Time") and for several hit songs performed by Aaliyah (incl. "Rock The Boat," "Hot Like Fire," "Try Again," "We Need A Resolution," "Are You That Somebody," and "More Than a Woman"). Additional high-profile dance routines choreographed by Robinson include the Backstreet Boys' "Everybody (Backstreet's Back)" and "As Long As You Love Me" and Mary J. Blige's "Family Affair", for which Robinson won the 2002 MTV Video Music Award for Best Choreography.Robinson choreographed and directed the "Hey Mama" and "My Humps" videos by The Black Eyed Peas (the latter co-directed by Malik Hassan Sayeed and the recipient of the 2006 MTV Video Music Award for Best Hip-Hop Video), "Taken for Granted" by Sia, "All About That Bass," "Dear Future Husband," and "No" by Meghan Trainor and Koda Kumi's "Touch Down" and "LALALALALA". Robinson's most recent choreography credits include Fergie's "M.I.L.F. $" music video as well as Gwen Stefani's This Is What The Truth Feels Like Tour in 2016.

Robinson's choreography credits for film include Save the Last Dance (starring Julia Stiles and Sean Patrick Thomas), Dreamgirls (starring Beyoncé Knowles and Jennifer Hudson), and The Cheetah Girls: One World. In addition, Robinson choreographed the Black Eyed Peas' halftime show for Super Bowl XLV in 2011, and the December 2015 presentation of The Wiz Live!.

Robinson also recently produced "Taking the Stage: Changing America", a concert honoring the opening of the Smithsonian National Museum of African American History and Culture, and the VH1 2016 Hip Hop Honors: All Hail the Queens at the Lincoln Center. She is the woman behind Kendrick Lamar's 2016 Grammy's performance and The Weeknd's 2016 Oscars performance of "Earned It." From 2014 to 2016, she also served as segment producer and choreographer for the hit series The Voice.

References

External links 

Fatima Robinson at mvdbase
Fatima Robinson at StyleLikeU

1971 births
American choreographers
Artists from Little Rock, Arkansas
Living people
Female music video directors
American music video directors